

Pityocona is a small and little-known genus of the twirler moth family (Gelechiidae). Among these, it is believed to belong to subfamily Gelechiinae, but beyond that its relationships are still obscure.

They are small inconspicuous moths with pointed wings. In the forewing, the second vein is weakly developed but not joined to the third. Their labial palps have a pointed tip and the second segment is unornamented.

The genus contains five species, one of which was described only in 2006:
 Pityocona attenuata J.F.G.Clarke, 1986
 Pityocona bifurcatus Wadhawan & Walia, 2006
 Pityocona porphyroscia Meyrick, 1927
 Pityocona probleta Bradley, 1961
 Pityocona xeropis Meyrick, 1918

Footnotes

References

  (1986): Pyralidae and Microlepidoptera of the Marquesas Archipelago. Smithsonian Contributions to Zoology 416: 1-485. PDF fulltext (214 MB!)
  (2004): Butterflies and Moths of the World, Generic Names and their Type-species – Pityocona. Version of 2004-NOV-05. Retrieved 2011-OCT-16.

 
Gelechiinae
Taxa named by Edward Meyrick
Moth genera